Martinella is a genus of air-breathing land snails, terrestrial pulmonate gastropod mollusks in the family Streptaxidae.

Distribution 
The distribution of the genus Martinella includes:
 Ecuador
 south Brazil

Species
Species within the genus Martinella include:
 Martinella prisca Thiele, 1927

References

Streptaxidae